Manor Cultural Prize is a Swiss fine arts prize awarded every two years by the Manor (department store) alongside art museums in 12 Swiss cities, which was founded in 1982 in Lucerne. The goal is to promote emerging artists under the age of 40.

About 
Manor Cultural Prize was founded in 1982 by Philippe Nordmann. The award includes a cash prize (roughly 15,000 Swiss francs), the acquisition of art for their museum art collection, an exhibition and published exhibition catalogue.

Awardees 
This is a select list of the Manor Cultural Prize awardees, organized by location and date. The first award was given in Lucerne in 1982.

Canton of Aargau

Canton of Basel

Canton of Bern

Canton of Geneva

Canton of Graubünden

Canton of Lucerne

Canton of Schaffhausen

Canton of St. Gallen

Canton of Ticino

Canton of Valais

Canton of Vaud

Canton of Zurich

Notes

References

External links 
 Official website

Swiss awards
Awards established in 1982